The Chi is an American drama television series created by Lena Waithe about life in a neighborhood on the South Side  of Chicago. The pilot was directed by Rick Famuyiwa. It premiered on Showtime on January 7, 2018. In August 2021, after the conclusion of the fourth season, it was announced that the series was renewed for a fifth season which premiered on June 24, 2022. In August 2022, the series was renewed for a sixth season.

Premise
The Chi is described as following "a fateful turn of events that sends shockwaves through a community on the Southside of Chicago and connects the lives of Emmett, Brandon, Ronnie and Kevin in unexpected ways."

Cast

Main
Jason Mitchell as Brandon Johnson (seasons 1–2)
Ntare Guma Mbaho Mwine as Ronnie Davis (seasons 1–3)
Jacob Latimore as Emmett Washington
Alex Hibbert as Kevin Williams
Tiffany Boone as Jerrika Little (seasons 1–2), Brandon's girlfriend.
Yolonda Ross as Jada Washington, Emmett's mother.
Armando Riesco as Detective Cruz (seasons 1–2)
Rolando Boyce as Darnell (seasons 2–present),  Emmett's father.
Barton Fitzpatrick as Reg Taylor (season 2; recurring seasons 1), Jake's older brother and gang leader.
Shamon Brown Jr. as Stanley "Papa" Jackson (season 2—present; recurring season 1), Kevin and Jake's best friend.
Michael V. Epps as Jake Taylor (season 2–present; recurring season 1), Kevin and Papa's best friend and Reg and Trig's younger brother.
Birgundi Baker as Kiesha Williams (season 3–present; recurring seasons 1–2), Kevin's older sister.
 Luke James as Victor "Trig" Taylor (season 4–present; recurring season 3), Reg and Jake's estranged older brother.
 Curtiss Cook as Otis "Douda" Perry (season 4–present; recurring 2–3)

Recurring
 Lucien Cambric as Jason Roxboro (season 1)
 Jahking Guillory as Charles Frederick “Coogie” Johnson (season 1,5)
Brian King as Detective Wallace (season 1)
 Steven Williams as Quentin "Q" Dickinson (season 1,5), a kingpin elder.
 Tosin Morohunfola as Trice (season 1)
 Byron Bowers as Meldrick (season 1)
 Sonja Sohn as Laverne Johnson (seasons 1 and 3,4), Brandon's mother.
 Cedric Young as Sonny (seasons 1–3), Q's brother and Emmett's boss.
 LaDonna Tittle as Ethel Davis (seasons 1–3), Ronnie's grandmother.
 Tyla Abercrumbie as Nina Williams, Kevin and Keisha's mother.
 Hannaha Hall as Tiffany, the mother of Emmett's child.
 José Antonio García as Mr. Gasca (seasons 1–2), Kevin's teacher.
 Genesis Denise Hale as Maisha
 Mariah Gordon as Andrea (season 1)
 Chris Lee as Hannibal (seasons 1–3), Brandon's cousin.
 Tai Davis as Tracy Roxboro, Jason's mother.
 Common as Rafiq (seasons 1–2)
 Crystal Dickinson as Detective Alice Toussaint (season 2)
 Miriam A. Hyman as Dre (since season 3), Nina's partner who is a high school counselor.
 Jasmine Davis as Imani (season 3-4), Trig's girlfriend. She leaves Trig in the season 5 premiere after she sees a video of Trig beating up a teen
 La La Anthony as Dominque "Dom" Morris (since season 3)
 Judae'a Brown as Jemma (since season 3)
 Kandi Burruss as Roselyn Perry (since season 3), Douda's estranged wife.
 Lena Waithe as Camille Hallaway (season 3), a mayoral candidate.
 Lil Rel Howery as Zeke Remnick (season 3), Sonny's landlord. 
 Tabitha Brown as Octavia (season 4)
 Jason Weaver as Rashaad "Shaad" Marshall (since season 4)
 Vic Mensa as Jamal (season 4)
 Da Brat as LaPortia (season 4)
 Cory Hardrict as Dante (season 4—5)

Episodes

Season 1 (2018)

Season 2 (2019)

Season 3 (2020)

Season 4 (2021)

Season 5 (2022)

Production

On January 30, 2018, Showtime renewed the series for a second season which premiered on April 7, 2019. On April 30, 2019, Showtime renewed the series for a third season which premiered on June 21, 2020. On May 20, 2019, it was announced that Jason Mitchell would not be returning to the show for season 3 because of "misconduct allegations". His character was killed off in the season 3 premiere  On September 8, 2020, Showtime renewed the series for a fourth season which premiered on May 23, 2021. In March 2021, production on the series was paused due to a positive COVID-19 test. On August 2, 2021, after the conclusion of the fourth season, it was announced that the series was renewed for a fifth season. The fifth season premiered on June 24, 2022. On August 18, 2022, the series was renewed for season six before the conclusion of season five.

Reception

Critical response
On review aggregator website Rotten Tomatoes, the first season holds a "certified fresh" approval rating of 87% based on 47 reviews, and an average rating of 7.47/10. The website's critical consensus reads, "Like an optimistic companion to The Wire, The Chi explores the complexities of life in the South Side of Chicago, with a tender touch and a clear affection for its captivating characters." On Metacritic, the season has a weighted average score of 73 out of 100, based on 22 critics, indicating "generally favorable reviews".

Accolades

References

Notes

External links

2010s American black television series
2020s American black television series
2010s American crime drama television series
2020s American crime drama television series
2018 American television series debuts
Coming-of-age television shows
Showtime (TV network) original programming
English-language television shows
Television series about organized crime
Television series by 20th Century Fox Television
Television shows directed by Justin Tipping
Television shows set in Chicago
Television shows filmed in Illinois
Gangs in fiction
Works about African-American organized crime
Television series by Kapital Entertainment
Salary controversies in television